HMS Comus was a corvette (reclassified in 1888 as a third-class cruiser) of the Royal Navy.  She was the name ship of her class.  Launched in April 1878, the vessel was built by Messrs. J. Elder & Co of Glasgow at a cost of £123,000.

Comus and her classmates were built during a period of naval transition.  Sail was giving way to steam, wooden hulls to metal, and smooth-bore muzzle-loading guns to naval rifles.  Comus shows this transition; she was driven by both sails and a reciprocating steam engine; her hull was iron and steel but sheathed with wood and copper; and some of her muzzleloading guns were replaced by rifled breechloaders.

Comus was active for about two decades, but in that time went to the ends of empire, from the British Isles to the Caribbean and Nova Scotia to southwest Africa in the western hemisphere, and in the eastern, from the southern Indian Ocean to the northwest Pacific, and from the China station to the Strait of Magellan.

Design

Comus was a single-screw corvette (later classified as a third-class cruiser) designed for distant cruising service for the British Empire. Built with iron frames and steel plating, she was sheathed with wood and coppered.  The hull was unprotected except for a 1.5 in (38 mm) of armour over the machinery spaces. with some additional protection offered by the coal bunkers flanking the engine spaces and magazines.

Comus had a ship rig, with squaresails on all three masts.  She and her class were among the last of the sailing corvettes. The vessel was also equipped with a steam engine driving a single screw with 2,590 indicated horsepower; to reduce resistance, this propeller could be hoisted into a slot cut in the keel when the vessel was under sail.

The ship initially carried two 7-inch muzzle-loading rifles, four breechloading 6-inch 80-pounder guns and  eight 64-pdr muzzle-loading rifles, but the breech loaders proved unsatisfactory and were replaced in the rest of the class with more 64-pounders.

Career
On 15 September 1878, the British steamship City of Mecca ran into Comus and the Italian barque Cosmopolita in the Clyde, damaging both vessels.

1879–1884 Indian and Pacific Oceans
Comus was fitted for sea at Sheerness and commissioned on 23 October 1879 for service on the China Station, under Captain James East and First Lieutenant (later Rear Admiral) George Neville.  In November of that year she was still completing her trials.  The ship then sailed for China, but was first assigned a "particular service", a search for Knowlsey Hall, an iron sailing vessel which had not been heard from since her departure from Liverpool in May 1879.  Comus searched the Crozet Islands, and other islands in the southern Indian Ocean. In 1880 Comus returned to the Crozets in order to deposit a cache of provisions at Possession Island for the use of shipwrecked mariners.  The 1881 census, which included British ships at sea, listed Chinese amongst her crew.  In 1881–82 the ship was at the Pellew Islands off the north coast of Australia.

Later in 1882 Comus crossed the Pacific Ocean to San Francisco, and refit to prepare to take the Marquis of Lorne, Governor General of Canada, and his spouse the Princess Louise, daughter of Queen Victoria, to British Columbia.  An anonymous note threatened the ship with destruction when the couple boarded, but a search yielded nothing, and the US revenue cutter  escorted the corvette out of the harbour. Comus delivered the couple to Esquimalt Harbour at Victoria, British Columbia in September.  The next month Comus rendered assistance to two American vessels in distress off Vancouver Island, actions for which Captain East was awarded a gold medal by the President of the United States.  Comus returned the governor-general and the princess to San Francisco in December.

In 1884 Comus sailed for home.  Upon arrival in 1885, the corvette was rearmed and was partially rebuilt.  The 7-inch guns and the 64-pounders at the corners were removed; the latter were replaced by 6-inch breechloaders on new sponsons.  A single conning tower replaced the old pair.

1886–1891 North American and West Indies Station
After the refit Comus recommissioned 6 April 1886 for service on the North American and West Indies Station. In 1889 the ship transported scientists to observe the total eclipse of the sun off western Africa, and noted astronomer Stephen Joseph Perry died aboard the vessel from dysentery contracted ashore.

1895–1898 Return to the Pacific

In 1891 she returned to Britain and was again refitted and rearmed.  On 1 October 1895 she recommissioned for service in the Pacific, and at the end of the year was reporting on lighthouses being erected by Chile in the Strait of Magellan. She saluted Alcatraz upon arrival in San Francisco 5 October 1896 while under the command of Captain H. H. Dyke.   In 1897 Comus rescued shipwrecked sailors off Acapulco in July,  called at Honolulu, Hawaii in September, and visited Pitcairn Island in the south Pacific in November.  The ship then returned home to be placed in reserve.

1898–1900 Return to North American and West Indies Station
Later in 1898 the ship was reassigned to the North American and West Indies station. Comus engaged in fisheries protection, and was in Halifax, Nova Scotia in 1899, and in the West Indies near Trinidad in early 1900 under the command of Captain George Augustus Giffard. On her way home she visited the Azores Islands in March 1900.

1900–1904 Retirement and scrapping
Comus paid off that same year, and was stricken in 1902.  The ship was sold 17 May 1904 for £3625, and was broken up at Barrow by Messrs Thos. W. Ward.

References

Principal sources

External links

 

1878 ships
Ships built on the River Clyde
Victorian-era corvettes of the United Kingdom
Victorian-era cruisers of the United Kingdom
Comus-class corvettes
Maritime incidents in September 1878